Mendocino Homeland is an extended play by the American punk rock band The Lookouts. It was released in 1989 through vocalist/guitarist Larry Livermore's label Lookout! Records.

Track listing
All songs written by Kain Kong, except where noted.  

"I Saw Her Standing There" - 2:37
"Judgment Day" (Tré Cool) - 3:09
"Relijion Ain't Kül" - 2:59
"Mendocino Homeland" - 2:35

Personnel
 Larry Livermore - lead vocals, guitar
 Kain Kong - bass, backing vocals
 Tré Cool - drums, lead vocals on "Judgment Day"

Production
 Kevin Army - producer, engineer, mixing
 The Lookouts - producers
 John Golden - mastering

References

1989 EPs
The Lookouts albums
Lookout! Records EPs